The 2019–20 Cypriot Second Division is the 65th season of the Cypriot second-level football league. It began on 20 September 2019 and ended in March 2020 due to the Covid-19 pandemic.

Format
Sixteen teams are divided into 2 groups of 8 teams each (Groups A and B). Each plays the others from its own group twice, home and away, for a total of 14 games each, over 14 game weeks. Teams in places 1-4 of each group qualify for Premier Group where the first two teams were promoted to the First Division, and the rest for Standard Group where the last four teams would be relegated to the Third Division - however due to the pandemic, no teams were relegated this season.

Team changes from 2018–19

Teams promoted to 2019–20 Cypriot First Division
 Ethnikos Achna
 Olympiakos Nicosia

Teams relegated from 2018–19 Cypriot First Division
 Alki Oroklini
 Ermis Aradippou

Teams promoted from 2018–19 Cypriot Third Division
 Digenis Morphou
 Omonia Psevda
 Ypsonas FC
 P.O. Xylotymbou

Teams relegated to 2019–20 Cypriot Third Division
 THOI Lakatamia
 MEAP Nisou
 PAEEK
 Digenis Oroklinis

Stadiums and locations

Note: Table lists clubs in alphabetical order.

First phase

Group A

Standings

Results

Group B

Standings

Results

Second phase

Premier Group

Standings

Results

Standard Group

Standings

Results

References

Cypriot Second Division seasons
Cyprus
2019–20 in Cypriot football